Kositsino is a rural locality (a selo) in Novooskolsky District, Belgorod Oblast, Russia. The population was 164 as of 2010. There are 3 streets.

Geography 
Kositsino is located 10 km south of Novy Oskol (the district's administrative centre) by road. Fironovka is the nearest rural locality.

References 

Rural localities in Novooskolsky District